A handshake is a globally widespread, brief greeting or parting tradition in which two people grasp one of each other's like hands, in most cases accompanied by a brief up-and-down movement of the grasped hands. Customs surrounding handshakes are specific to cultures. Different cultures may be more or less likely to shake hands, or there may be different customs about how or when to shake hands.


History

The handshake may have originated in prehistory as a demonstration of peaceful intent, since it shows that the hand holds no weapon. Another possibility is that it originated as a symbolic gesture of mutual commitment to an oath or promise: two hands clasping each other represents the sealing of a bond. One of the earliest known depictions of a handshake is an ancient Assyrian relief of the 9th century BC depicting the Assyrian king Shalmaneser III shaking the hand of the Babylonian king Marduk-zakir-shumi I to seal an alliance.
Archaeological ruins and ancient texts show that handshaking was practiced in ancient Greece (where it was called dexiosis) as early as the 5th century BC. For example, a depiction of two soldiers shaking hands can be found on part of a 5th-century BC funerary stele that is on display in Berlin’s Pergamon Museum (stele SK1708) and on other funerary steles, such as one from the 4th century BC that depicts Thraseas and his wife Euandria shaking hands.

Depictions of handshakes also appear in Archaic Greek, Etruscan and Roman funerary and non-funerary art. Muslim scholars have written that the custom of handshaking was introduced to them by the people of Yemen.

Gallery

Modern customs

There are various customs surrounding handshakes, both generally and specific to certain cultures:

The handshake is commonly done upon meeting, greeting, parting, offering congratulations, expressing gratitude, or as a public sign of completing a business or diplomatic agreement. In sports or other competitive activities, it is also done as a sign of good sportsmanship. Its purpose is to convey trust, respect, balance, and equality. If it is done to form an agreement, the agreement is not official until the hands are parted.

Unless health issues or local customs dictate otherwise, a handshake is made usually with bare hands. It depends on the situation.

 In Anglophone countries, handshaking is common in business situations. In casual non-business situations, men are more likely to shake hands than women.
 In the Netherlands and Belgium, handshakes are done more often, especially on meeting.
 In Switzerland, it may be expected to shake the women's hands first.
 Austrians shake hands when meeting, often including with children.
 In the United States a traditional handshake is firm, executed with the right hand, with good posture and eye contact.
 In Mediterranean countries such as Portugal, Spain and Italy, and if anything even more so among men of these heritages in the Americas, a very firm, even hard, handshake is expected.
 In Russia, a handshake is performed by men and rarely performed by women.
 Handshakes between men and women are not encouraged in conservative Muslim societies and countries such as Saudi Arabia, Iraq, Pakistan, Iran, etc. As a general rule, in such conservative societies and countries, men are not allowed to get close to the opposite sex or touch them and vice versa. In less conservative Muslim-majority countries like Turkey, men and women can shake hands with each other, depending on the setting and society. 
 In some countries such as Turkey or the Arabic-speaking Middle East, handshakes are not as firm as in the West. Consequently, a grip that is too firm is rude. 
 Moroccans also give one kiss on each cheek (lips don't touch the cheek unless they are family) (to corresponding genders) together with the handshake. Also, in some countries, a variation exists where instead of kisses, and the handshake the palm is then placed on the heart.
 In China, age is considered important in handshake etiquette, and older people should be greeted with a handshake before others. A weak handshake is also preferred, but people shaking hands often hold on to each other's hands for an extended period after the initial handshake.
 In Japan, there is not a tradition of shaking hands and it is preferred to formally bow (with hands open by their sides) to each other. Japanese people may greet foreigners with a handshake; foreigners are advised to let Japanese people initiate any handshakes, and a weak handshake is preferred.
 In India and several nearby countries, the respectful Namaste gesture, sometimes combined with a slight bow, is traditionally used in place of handshakes. Handshakes are preferred in business and other formal settings.
 In Norway, where a firm handshake is preferred, people will most often shake hands when agreeing on deals, in private and business relations.
 In Korea, a senior person will initiate a handshake, which is preferred to be weak. It is a sign of respect to grasp the right arm with the left hand when shaking hands. It is considered disrespectful to put the free hand in one's pocket while shaking hands. Bowing is the preferred and conventional way of greeting a person in Korea.
  Related to a handshake but more casual, some people prefer a fist bump. Typically the fist bump is done with a clenched hand. Only the knuckles of the hand are typically touched to the knuckles of the other person's hand. Like a handshake the fist bump may be used to acknowledge a relationship with another person. Unlike the formality of a handshake, the fist bump is typically not used to seal a business deal or in formal business settings.
 The hand hug is a type of handshake popular with politicians, as it can present them as being warm, friendly, trustworthy and honest. This type of handshake involves covering the clenched hands with the remaining free hand, creating a sort of "cocoon".
 Scouts shake hands with their left hands as a gesture of trust, a practice which originated when the founder of the movement, Lord Baden-Powell of Gilwell, then a British cavalry officer, met an African tribesman.
In some areas of Africa, handshakes are continually held to show that the conversation is between the two talking. If they are not shaking hands, others are permitted to enter the conversation.
 Masai men in Africa greet one another by a subtle touch of palms of their hands for a very brief moment of time.
 In Liberia, the snap handshake is customary in which the two shakers snap their fingers against each other at the conclusion of the handshake.
 In Ethiopia, it is considered rude to use the left hand during a handshake. While greeting the elderly or a person in authority, it is also customary to accompany the handshake with a bow and the left hand supporting the right. This is especially important if it is the first time.
In Thailand, handshaking is only done if the traditional wai is not offered. When a person offers a wai, placing their palms together at chest level and bowing. This is then returned, with men saying “Sawadee-krap” and women, saying “Sawadee-kah” (both mean “Hello").
In Armenia, handshakes are the most common greetings between men, optionally followed by a kiss on the cheek if the two parties have a close relationship.  Traditionally, a woman needs to wait for the man to present his hand for the handshake. Women usually greet each other with hugs and a kiss on the cheek.

Germ spreading 
Handshakes are known to spread a number of microbial pathogens. Certain diseases such as scabies are known to spread most frequently through direct skin-to-skin contact. A medical study has found that fist bumps and high fives spread fewer germs than handshakes.

During the 2009 H1N1 pandemic, the dean of medicine at the University of Calgary, Tomas Feasby, suggested that fist bumps may be a "nice replacement of the handshake" in an effort to prevent transmission of the virus.

Following a 2010 study that showed that only about 40% of doctors and other health care providers complied with hand hygiene rules in hospitals, Mark Sklansky, a doctor at UCLA hospital, decided to test "a handshake-free zone" as a method  for limiting the spread of germs and reducing the transmission of disease. UCLA did not ban the handshakes outright, but rather suggested other options like fist bumping, smiling, bowing, waving, and non-contact Namaste gestures. Other sources suggest raised brows, smiling, wai bow, two claps, hand over heart, sign language wave, or the shaka sign.

During the COVID-19 pandemic, several countries and organisations adopted policies encouraging people to use alternative modes of greeting instead of a handshake. Suggested alternatives included the elbow bump, the fist bump, foot tapping or non-contact actions for social distancing purposes, such as a namaste gesture. Footshaking was also suggested.

Chemosignaling
It has been discovered as a part of a research in the Weizmann Institute, that human handshakes serve as a means of transferring social chemical signals between the shakers. 
It appears that there is a tendency to bring the shaken hands to the vicinity of the nose and smell them. They may serve an evolutionary need to learn about the person whose hand was shaken, replacing a more overt sniffing behavior, as is common among animals and in certain human cultures (such as Tuvalu, Greenland or rural Mongolia, where a quick sniff is part of the traditional greeting ritual).

World records
In 1963, Lance Dowson shook 12,500 individuals' hands in  hours, in Wrexham, N. Wales.
Atlantic City, New Jersey Mayor Joseph Lazarow was recognized by the Guinness Book of World Records for a July 1977 publicity stunt, in which the mayor shook more than 11,000 hands in a single day, breaking the record previously held by President Theodore Roosevelt, who had set the record with 8,510 handshakes at a White House reception on 1 January 1907. Dowson's record was recognised by the Guinness World Records Organisation and published in their 1964 publication.  On 31 August 1987, Stephen Potter from St Albans shook 19,550 hands at the St Albans Carnival to take the world record for shaking most hands verified by the Guinness Book of World Records. In 1992 Scott Killon of Vancouver,Canada set a World Record of 25,289 hands at the Worlds Fair in Seville, Spain. A photo of Scott Killon with a Canadian Mountie is shown in the 1994 edition of the Guinness Book. The record has since been exceeded but has been retired from the book. 

On 27 May 2008, Kevin Whittaker and Cory Jens broke the Guinness World Record for the World's Longest Handshake (single hand) in San Francisco, CA by shaking hands for 9 hours and 30 minutes, besting the previous record of 9 hours and 19 minutes set in 2006. This record stood briefly until 16 August 2008 when Kirk Williamson and Richard McCulley were recognized by Guinness World Records for the longest time two people shook hands uninterruptedly for 10 hours at Aloha Stadium in Aiea, Hawaii USA.  On 21 September 2009, Jack Tsonis and Lindsay Morrison then broke that record by shaking hands for 12 hours, 34 minutes and 56 seconds. Their record was broken less than a month later in Claremont, California, when John-Clark Levin and George Posner shook hands for 15 hours, 15 minutes, and 15 seconds. The next month, on 21 November, Matthew Rosen and Joe Ackerman surpassed this feat, with a new world record time of 15 hours, 30 minutes and 45 seconds certified in an edition of the Guinness Book of Records on page 111. 

At 8 p.m. EST on Friday 14 January 2011 a new attempt at the longest hand-shake commenced in New York Times Square and the existing record was broken by semi-professional world record-breaker Alastair Galpin and Don Purdon from New Zealand and Nepalese brothers Rohit and Santosh Timilsina who agreed to share the new record after 33 hours and 3 minutes.

On 29 January 2020, a new world record for the longest handshaking relay was set by approximately 1,817 people in Abu Dhabi, United Arab Emirates at Umm Al Emarat Park in an event organized by the Abu Dhabi Police to celebrate the 1 year anniversary of the signing of the Document on Human Fraternity for World Peace and Living Together in the city.

See also

References

External links
 
 
 
 http://www.videacesky.cz/ostatni-zabavna-videa/gesta-napric-kulturami

Greetings
Parting traditions
Hand gestures
Disease transmission